Boom Boom Chi Boom Boom is the third studio album by Tom Tom Club, released in 1988. It includes a cover of the Velvet Underground's "Femme Fatale", with David Byrne, Lou Reed, and Jerry Harrison. The track "Suboceana" was released as a single in the UK in late 1988 and received some radio airplay. In the US, a 12-inch (5 track maxi-)single of the song was released, which featured a remix by Marshall Jefferson, and contains the track "Devil, Does Your Dog Bite". That song is a bonus (track 11) on the Japanese issue of the album that has the original 10 songs (like the European 1988 issue). "Challenge of the Love Warriors" is played over the ending credits of Mary Lambert's 1987 mystery thriller Siesta though it is not included on the soundtrack album, also released in 1987, from Miles Davis and Marcus Miller.

Production
The band began working on the album in 1986, and eventually spent two months recording it.

Critical reception
Trouser Press preferred the US version of the album, writing that it "is as much fun for as deep as you care to listen." The Rolling Stone Album Guide called the album "forced" and "hollow-sounding." The Los Angeles Times called it "a fluffy funkasonic fun house that serves as a fine complement to the Heads’ more arty melanges." The Rough Guide to Rock deemed the songs "polite white soul arrangements."

Track listing
All songs written by Tina Weymouth and Chris Frantz, except where noted.
 "Suboceana" (Tina Weymouth, Frantz, Laura Weymouth) – 4:53
 "Shock the World" – 3:51
 "Don't Say No" – 4:30
 "Challenge of the Love Warriors" (Frantz) – 3:07
 "Femme Fatale" (Lou Reed) – 2:48
 "Born for Love" – 4:24
 "Broken Promises" – 3:45
 "She Belongs to Me" (Bob Dylan) – 4:03
 "Little Eva" – 4:00
 "Mighty Teardrop" (Tina Weymouth, Frantz, Laura Weymouth) – 4:13

US/Canada (1989) track listing
The album was heavily revised for issue in the US and Canada. Three tracks of the original 1988 issue were dropped ("Born for Love", "Broken Promises" and "Mighty Teardrop"), while four new tracks were added ("Call of the Wild", "Kiss Me When I Get Back", "Wa Wa Dance" and "I Confess").

 "Call of the Wild" (Tina Weymouth, Frantz, Mark Roule, Gary Pozner) mixed by Gary Wilkinson
 "Kiss Me When I Get Back" (Tina Weymouth, Frantz, Mark Roule, Gary Pozner) mixed by Louis Scalise
 "Wa Wa Dance" (Tina Weymouth, Frantz, Mark Roule, Gary Pozner) mixed by Gary Wilkinson
 "I Confess" (Tina Weymouth, Frantz, Mark Roule, Gary Pozner) mixed by David Sussman
 "Challenge of the Love Warriors"
 "Suboceana"
 "Don't Say No"
 "Shock the World"
 "Little Eva"
 "Femme Fatale"
 "She Belongs to Me" (on CD version only) mixed by Mark Roule

Personnel
Tina Weymouth – bass, keyboards, rhythm guitar, vocals; harmonium on "Femme Fatale"
Chris Frantz – drums, keyboards, percussion, front cover painting
Mark Roule – guitar, backing vocals
Gary Pozner – keyboards, drum programming, percussion, backing vocals
Laura Weymouth – backing vocals 
Wally Badarou – Synclavier on "Challenge of the Love Warriors" and Bell keyboards on "Broken Promises"
Steve Scales – bongos, percussion on "Challenge of the Love Warriors"
Jerry Harrison – keyboards, backing vocals on "Femme Fatale"
Lou Reed – guitar, backing vocals on "Femme Fatale"
David Byrne – guitar, backing vocals on "Femme Fatale"
Eddie Martinez – guitar on "Born for Love"
Jay Berliner – Spanish guitar on "Broken Promises"
Glenn Rosenstein – rhythm guitar on "Born for Love", keyboards on "She Belongs to Me"
Heidi Berg – violin on "Little Eva"
Coco Arnesen Roule – vocals on "Call of the Wild"
Tiny Valentine – vocals on "Wa Wa Dance"
Technical
Glenn Rosenstein - engineer, mixing
Mark Roule and Steven Stanley - additional engineer

Chart performance
The album spent 11 weeks on the U.S. Billboard album charts and reached its peak position of #114 in May 1989.

References

1988 albums
Sire Records albums
Tom Tom Club albums
Albums produced by Chris Frantz
Albums produced by Tina Weymouth
Albums produced by Arthur Baker (musician)
Fontana Records albums